Fizzjob is the debut album of Didjits, released in 1986 through Bam Bam Records.

Track listing

Personnel 
Didjits
Doug Evans – bass guitar
Brad Sims – drums
Rick Sims – vocals, guitar
Production and additional personnel
Iain Burgess – production
Didjits – production
David Landis – illustrations

References

External links 
 

1986 debut albums
Albums produced by Iain Burgess
The Didjits albums
Touch and Go Records albums